Borama is the largest city of the northwestern Awdal region of Somaliland The commercial seat of the province, it is situated near the border with Ethiopia.

During the Middle Ages, Borama was ruled by the Adal Sultanate. It later formed a part of the British Somaliland protectorate in the first half of the 20th century.

According to the UNDP in 2014, the city had a population of around 398,609 making it one of the largest cities inside Somaliland. It has been a leading example in community organizing, having been the first area in Somaliland to adopt a self-help scheme in the wake of the civil war.

History

As with several nearby towns such as Amud, numerous archaeological finds have been discovered in the Borama area that point to an eventful past. The latter include ancient remains of tombs, houses and mosques, in addition to sherds of Oriental wares, particularly Chinese porcelain. The artefacts and structures date from various historical periods, ranging from the 12th through to the 18th centuries. Most, however, are from the 15th and 16th centuries, a time of great commercial activity in the region that is associated with the medieval Adal Sultanate.

Excavations in the late 1800s and early 1900s at over fourteen sites in the vicinity of Borama unearthed, among other things, coins identified as having been derived from Kait Bey, the eighteenth Burji Mamluk Sultan of Egypt. Most of these finds were sent to the British Museum for preservation shortly after their discovery.

In the first half of the 20th century, Borama formed a part of the British Somaliland protectorate. It was later given district status in 1925.

In 1933, Sheikh Abdurahman Sheikh Nuur, a Qur'anic teacher and son of Borama's qadi (judge), devised a new orthography for transcribing the Afro-Asiatic Cushitic Somali language. A quite accurate phonetic writing system, this Borama script was principally used by Nuur, his circle of associates in the city and some of the merchants in control of trade in Zeila and Borama. Students of Sheikh Nuur were also trained in the use of this script.  .The alphabet is also generally known as the Gadabuursi script.

During the onset of World War II, the Italians captured the town. It was re-captured by the British the following year, in 1940. In the post-independence period, Borama was administered as part of the official Awdal administrative region of Somalia. During the Ogaden War in the late 1970s, Borama was one of several northern cities aerially bombarded by Ethiopian forces.

Geography

Location and habitat

Borama is situated in a mountainous and hilly area. It has green meadows and fields and represents a key focal point for wildlife. The town's unusual fertility and greenery in the largely arid countryside have attracted many faunas, such as gazelles, birds, and camels.

Climate
The prevailing climate in Borama is known as a hot semi-arid climate (Köppen BSh).

Demographics
As of 2014, Borama had a population of around 398,609 inhabitants. The Awdal region in which the city is situated is inhabited by people from the Somali ethnic group, with the Gadabuursi subclan of the Dir especially well represented and considered the predominant clan of the region.

Federico Battera (2005) states about the Awdal Region:
"Awdal is mainly inhabited by the Gadabuursi confederation of clans."

A UN report published by Canada: Immigration and Refugee Board of Canada (1999), states concerning Awdal:
"The Gadabuursi clan dominates Awdal region. As a result, regional politics in Awdal is almost synonymous with Gadabuursi internal clan affairs."

Roland Marchal (1997) states that numerically, the Gadabuursi are the predominant inhabitants of the Awdal Region:
"The Gadabuursi's numerical predominance in Awdal virtually ensures that Gadabuursi interests drive the politics of the region."

Marleen Renders and Ulf Terlinden (2010) both state that the Gadabuursi almost exclusively inhabit the Awdal Region:
"Awdal in western Somaliland is situated between Djibouti, Ethiopia, and the Issaq-populated mainland of Somaliland. It is primarily inhabited by the three sub-clans of the Gadabursi clan, whose traditional institutions survived the colonial period, Somali statehood and the war in good shape, remaining functionally intact and highly relevant to public security."

There is also a sizeable minority of the Issa subclan of the Dir who mainly inhabit the Zeila district.

Education

Currently, there are 52 primary and secondary schools in Borama. These schools can be divided into three main categories: public primary and secondary schools, private primary and secondary schools and Religious schools.

Total number of students in Borama is 15,314.

Transportation

For air transportation, Borama is served by the Borama International Airport. It is the only airport in the Awdal region. The facility was named in honor of Aden Isaaq, Somalia's first Minister of Education. The airport is not in use; however, there are plans to rejuvenate it.

Notable residents

Yussur A.F. Abrar – former Governor of the Central Bank of Somalia
Hassan Sheikh Mumin - Somali poet, playwright, broadcaster, actor and composer.
Suleiman Ahmed Guleid - President Of Amoud University
Sh. Abdillahi Sh.Ali Jawhar - Son of Sh. Ali jawhar and religious leader

See also
Baki District
Zeila
Lughaya

Notes

References

Somali reconstruction and Local Initiative: Amoud University. Published in World Development (2001).

Populated places in Awdal
Cities of the Adal Sultanate
British Somaliland in World War II